Tim Wood  may refer to:
Timothy Wood (born 1940), British Conservative Party  politician, Member of Parliament (MP) for Stevenage 1983–1997
Tim Wood (figure skater) (born 1948), American figure skater
Tim Wood (boxer) (1951–2010), British boxer
Tim Wood (baseball) (born 1982), American baseball player
A Mnemonic for the seven wastes of Muda (Japanese term)